In the 2013–14 season, AEK played in the Greek A2 Division. At the finish of the season, AEK was the winner of the league's championship, and got promoted back to the top-tier level Greek Basket League, after 3 years of absence in that league. AEK had a record 23 wins and 3 losses in the A2 League (Greek 2nd Division). AEK also participated in the Greek Cup, where it was disqualified early on in the competition.

Roster

Depth chart

Technical and medical staff & academies staff

Friendlies

Competitions

Greek A2 Basket League

Results summary
Wins 23
Losses 3

Greek Cup

References

Sources
Greek Basketball Federation Standings and results
sentragoal.gr Results of A2

2013–14
2013–14 in Greek basketball by club